Pinball Hall of Fame: The Williams Collection is a pinball video game developed by FarSight Studios and published by Crave Entertainment for Wii, PlayStation 2, PlayStation 3, PlayStation Portable, Xbox 360, and Nintendo 3DS.  Players play on a variety of classic virtual pinball machines from Williams Electronics' history.  The Williams Collection follows the previous title, Pinball Hall of Fame: The Gottlieb Collection.

The game was released by System 3 in PAL territories on June 17, 2011 as Williams Pinball Classics. This title should not to be confused with Williams Pinball Classics (2001) by Encore, Inc. that features four machines (Creature from the Black Lagoon, Tales of the Arabian Nights, Black Rose and Lost World) for Windows.

Gameplay
All machines are available at the start of play, but some require players to use credits. The player begins the game with 20 credits and earn more by obtaining specials and accomplishing various goals on each machine. For 100 credits, players can buy any of the locked machines for free-play mode. Completing the five goals for any machines also allows players to unlock a locked machine.

Other unlockable options include the ability to use custom-textured pinballs, play a left-to-right inverted (Mirror Mode) version of the game, and disable tilt detection. Flipper control remains intuitive in Mirror Mode, with the left trigger controlling the left on-screen flipper.  Side-specific features of some games, such as Lane Change, move to the opposite side of the machine.

In the Wii version of the game, the player uses the trigger buttons of the Wii Remote and Nunchuk to activate the flippers. The machine can be bumped or shifted with the motion sensors in either the Remote or Nunchuck. The resulting motion is proportional in magnitude and identical in direction to the controller's motion. This allows skilled players to use just enough motion to perform advanced ball saves without triggering the tilt mechanism, just as can be done on a physical machine.

Machines
{| class="wikitable sortable"
|- 
! rowspan="2" |Table
! rowspan="2" |Year
! colspan="4" |Platform(s)
|-
! style="width:3em; font-size:90%" class="unsortable" | Wii and PSP
! style="width:3em; font-size:90%" class="unsortable" | PS3 and 360
! style="width:3em; font-size:90%" class="unsortable" | PS2
! style="width:3em; font-size:90%" class="unsortable" | 3DS
|-
|Black Knight
|1980
|
|
|
|
|-
|FunHouse
|1990
|
|
|
|
|-
|Gorgar
|1979
|
|
|
|
|-
|PIN•BOT
|1986
|
|
|
|
|-
|Space Shuttle
|1984
|
|
|
|
|-
|Taxi
|1988
|
|
|
|
|-
|Whirlwind
|1990
|
|
|
|
|-
|Firepower
|1980
|
|
|
|
|-
|Jive Time
|1970
|
|
|
|
|-
|Sorcerer
|1985
|
|
|
|
|-
|Tales of the Arabian Nights
|1996
|
|
|
|
|-
|Medieval Madness
|1997
|
|
|
|
|-
|No Good Gofers
|1997
|
|<ref>"Day 2 E3 2009 - Pinball Hall of Fame: The Williams Collection Hands on Demo / Gameplay Video," Game Tactics (June 16, 2009).</ref>
|
|
|}

Notes

ReceptionPinball Hall of Fame: The Williams Collection received "positive" and "mixed or averages" reviews, according to review aggregator Metacritic. The Wii version was nominated for Best Graphics Technology for the Wii by IGN in its 2008 video game awards, while the PSP version was nominated for best PSP game of 2008 by GameSpot. Gamasutra named The Williams Collection the third most overlooked game of 2008.

Soundtrack
The soundtrack of this game features the following songs:

 "Full Throttle" — Eric Barnett
 "Premonition" — Chris Kline
 "Let Go" — Brett Rakestraw
 "Flipper Frenzy" — Jeremy Fannon
 "Maelstrom" — Don Madison
 "Depeche" — Nelson Everhart
 "Blast Off" — Damien Harrison
 "The Weezered" — Jim Watson
 "Arcade Jam" — Chris Kline
 "Oracle" — Chris Kline
 "Pinball Dreams" — Chris Kline
 "In the Groove" — Chris Kline

See also
 Pinball Hall of Fame
 Pinball Hall of Fame: The Gottlieb Collection The Pinball Arcade''

References

External links
 IGN Game Profile

2008 video games
Crave Entertainment games
FarSight Studios games
Nintendo 3DS games
PlayStation 2 games
PlayStation 3 games
PlayStation Portable games
Pinball video games
Video games developed in the United States
Wii games
Xbox 360 games
Williams pinball machines
Multiplayer and single-player video games